Crataegus canbyi is a hawthorn that is sometimes considered to be a synonym of C. crus-galli.

References

canbyi
Flora of North America